Šimon Falta (born 23 April 1993) is a Czech professional footballer who plays for Zbrojovka Brno on loan from Viktoria Plzeň.

References

External links
 
 

1993 births
Living people
Czech footballers
Czech Republic youth international footballers
Czech Republic under-21 international footballers
Association football midfielders
Czech First League players
SK Sigma Olomouc players
Czech Republic international footballers
FC Viktoria Plzeň players
FC Baník Ostrava players
People from Ústí nad Orlicí
Sportspeople from the Pardubice Region
FC Zbrojovka Brno players